The 2016–17 FA Trophy was the 47th season of the FA Trophy, the Football Association's cup competition for teams at levels 5–8 of the English football league system. A total of 276 clubs entered the competition, which was won by York City after beating Macclesfield Town 3–2 in front of 38,224 spectators at Wembley in the final on 21 May 2017.

Calendar

Preliminary round
A total of 128 clubs, from Level 8 of English football, entered preliminary round of the competition. Eight clubs from level 8 get a bye to the first round qualifying - Beaconsfield SYCOB, Heybridge Swifts, Kidsgrove Athletic, Market Drayton Town, Phoenix Sports, Waltham Abbey, Walton Casuals and Ware.

First round qualifying
A total of 144 teams took part in this stage of the competition including 64 winners from the preliminary round, 72 teams from Level 7 of English football and eight teams from level 8, who get a bye in the previous round.

Second round qualifying
A total of 72 teams took part in this stage of the competition, all winners from the first qualifying round.

Third round qualifying
A total of 80 teams took part in this stage of the competition, all winners from the second round qualifying and 44 clubs from Level 6 of English football.

First round proper
A total of 64 teams took part in this stage of the competition, all winners from the third round qualifying and the clubs from Level 5 of English football.

Second round proper

Third round proper

Fourth round proper

Semi-finals
Semi final fixtures are due to be played on 11 March and 18 March 2017, with the second leg going to extra time and penalties if required.

First leg

Second leg

Final

References

FA Trophy seasons
England
Fa Trophy